Social Services Agency is a public legal entity in Azerbaijan that provides services to persons in need of social services in the forms and types determined by the Law of the Republic of Azerbaijan "On Social Services", improving their social protection and well-being, as well as implementing state policy and regulation related to adoption. The Agency operates under the Ministry of Labor and Social Protection of the Population of the Republic of Azerbaijan.

History 
The Social Services Agency was established according to the Decree of the President of the Republic of Azerbaijan dated December 30, 2019 No. 912 "On additional measures related to the improvement of management in the field of social protection". The agency's charter was approved by Decree No. 1077 of the President of the Republic of Azerbaijan dated June 30, 2020.

Field of activity 
In accordance with the charter, the Agency's activities are as follows:
 Provide social services to individuals and families in need of social service
 Carry out analysis on the social protection of persons with disabilities
 Persons with disabilities determined in connection with the protection of the territorial integrity, independence, and constitutional structure of the Republic of Azerbaijan, families of martyrs, persons with disabilities determined in connection with the cancellation of the accident at the Chernobyl NPP (including the performance of military service duties), regardless of the date of registration, persons with visual disabilities to provide apartments or private houses for persons with disabilities and graduates of social service institutions and educational institutions for children who have lost their parents and are deprived of parental care
 Provide disabled persons with a special car based on medical prescription
Carry out work in the field of adoption
Establish sports and health centers to attract people with disabilities to physical education and sports, taking measures to identify talented people in this field
Provide temporary shelter to persons without fixed residence
Place neglected, abandoned and socially dangerous minors in social service institutions
Place people who are incapable of self-care due to senility, illness and disability in social service institutions
Establish state assistance centers for the purpose of implementing measures related to social protection *Carry out vocational and social rehabilitation of those in assistance centers created for victims of human trafficking
Ensure admission to social adaptation centers of persons released from serving sentences in penitentiary institutions
Ensure the issuance of the identity card of the martyr's family member
Structure of the Agency
Head Office of the Agency
Regional Branches of the Agency
Baku branch
Absheron-Khizi regional branch (Sumgait, Absheron, Khizi)
Guba-Khachmaz regional branch (Khachmaz, Shabran, Siyazan, Quba, Qusar)
Nagorno Shirvan regional branch (Shamakhi, Gobustan, Ismayilli, Agsu)
Shirvan-Salyan regional branch (Shirvan, Hajigabul, Neftchala, *Mil-Mugan regional branch (Sabirabad, Saatli, Imishli, Beylagan)
Lankaran-Astara regional branch (Masalli, Lankaran, Jalilabad, Yardimli, Lerik, Astara)
Central Aran regional branch (Ujar, Zardab, Kurdamir, Yevlax, Agdash, Goychay, Mingachevir)
Sheki-Zagatala regional branch (Sheki, Oguz, Gabala, Gakh, Zagatala, Balakan)
Karabakh regional branch (Aghdam, Tartar, Barda, Agjabedi, Fuzuli, Khojaly, Khankendi, Shusha, Khojavend)
Ganja-Dashkasan regional branch (Ganja, Goygol, Samukh, Naftalan, Goranboy, Dashkasan)
Qazakh-Tovuz regional branch (Tovuz, Gazakh, Agstafa, Shamkir, Gadabey)

The management of the Agency 
The agency applies progressive corporate governance standards in its operations and management. The governing body of the Agency is the board of directors. The management board carries out general management and control of the Agency's activities. The management board consists of 4 (four) members - the chairman of the management board appointed and dismissed by the Minister of Labor and Social Protection of the Republic of Azerbaijan and his 3 (three) deputies. The chairman of the Agency's board of directors is Vugar Behbudov.

References 

2020 establishments in Azerbaijan
Government agencies established in 2020